Roger Edmund Philbert Stanislaus (born 2 November 1968) is an English former professional footballer who made over 300 appearances in the Football League for Bury, Brentford and Leyton Orient as a left back.

Career

Arsenal 
A left back, Stanislaus joined First Division club Arsenal as a schoolboy and began an apprenticeship in 1985. He progressed sufficiently to sign his first professional contract in July 1986, but was released at the end of the 1986–87 season, without having made a first team appearance.

Brentford 
Stanislaus joined Third Division club Brentford on trial in September 1987 and impressed sufficiently to be awarded a permanent contract one month later. He quickly broke into the team and made 41 appearances and scored two goals during the 1987–88 season, which earned him a new two-year contract in April 1988. Stanislaus' "languid, yet hugely effective style" made him "a crowd favourite at left back". He had a memorable 1988–89 season, making a career-high 56 appearances and scoring two goals, one of which came with a 40-yard "screamer" in a 2–2 League Cup first round draw with Fulham early in the campaign. After a "not so impressive" 1989–90 season, Stanislaus elected to depart Griffin Park. He made 134 appearances and scored five goals during three seasons with the Bees.

Bury 
During the 1990 off-season, Stanislaus joined Third Division club Bury for a £90,000 tribunal-fixed fee. He remained with the club for five seasons and made 216 appearances and scored seven goals. Stanislaus' performances during the 1993–94 season saw him named in the Third Division PFA Team of the Year.

Leyton Orient 
On 11 July 1995, Stanislaus joined newly relegated Third Division club Leyton Orient for a £50,000 fee. He made 24 appearances before being banned from football for 12 months on 1 February 1996, for taking a performance-enhancing drug. He was sacked by Orient a matter of days later.

Peterborough United 
Stanislaus made a brief return to football with Second Division strugglers Peterborough United in March 1997, but made just two reserve team appearances.

Honours 
 Third Division PFA Team of the Year: 1993–94

Career statistics

See also
List of doping cases in sport

References

External links 

1968 births
Footballers from Hammersmith
English footballers
Association football fullbacks
Arsenal F.C. players
Brentford F.C. players
Bury F.C. players
Leyton Orient F.C. players
Living people
Peterborough United F.C. players
Doping cases in association football
English sportspeople in doping cases
English Football League players